Wilson Michael Urtecho Medina (born 6 November 1969) is a Peruvian engineer and politician, belonging to the National Solidarity and is a former Congressman representing the Region of La Libertad from 2006 until he was disqualified in December 2013, and he was banned from holding public office for a ten-year period . Urtecho was diagnosed with hypotonia as a child and uses a wheelchair.

Education and career 
He completed his primary, secondary and tertiary studies. Then he studied Chemical Engineering obtaining an engineering degree from the National University of Trujillo.

Urtecho holds a Master in Chemical engineering. After his graduation, he started working as head of informatics of the La Libertad regional government and parallel as a consultant for the Institute for Disasters and Environment. In 2003, he changed to the Chavimochic special irrigation project, where he worked as an informatic engineer until he entered politics in 2006.

Political career

Early political career 
In 2000, Urtecho joined the conservative National Renewal party of Rafael Rey, where he acted as a regional delegate for La Libertad. He ran for a seat in the elections of that year under the Avancemos alliance, but he was not elected. The following year, in the 2001 elections, he once again ran for a seat in Congress, under the National Unity list, representing La Libertad, but he was not elected once again.

Congressman 
In the 2006 elections, he was elected to Congress for the 2006–2011 term on the joint center-right National Unity list. In March 2010, he left the National Renewal to join the National Solidarity Party (PSN) of Lima's mayor Luis Castañeda. He became the regional political coordinator of that party in La Libertad. Urtecho was re-elected in the 2011 elections for another five-year term this time, on the National Solidarity Alliance. While he was in congress he was chairman of the Special Commission for Disability (CODIS). He served as Second Vice President of Congress during the 2009–2010 annual term and as Third Vice President of the Congress during the 2012–2013 annual term.

Disqualification 
In September 2013, former staff members accused Urtecho of failing to pay them for work they had done. Urtecho stood down from the congressional ethics committee while an investigation was launched. A separate investigation into Urtecho's income commenced shortly after, following allegations of financial irregularities stemming from his personal spending habits. The final report published by the ethics committee called for Urtecho's suspension for illegal embellishment. In December 2013, the Congress voted to approve his desafuero and banned him from holding public office for a ten-year period. He was replaced in office by Carmen Rosa Núñez.

References

External links
Official Congressional profile

Living people
People from Trujillo, Peru
National Solidarity Party (Peru) politicians
Members of the Congress of the Republic of Peru
1969 births
National Unity (Peru) politicians
National Renewal (Peru) politicians
Peruvian people with disabilities
People from La Libertad Region
People from Trujillo Province, Peru